Luther Daniel Lovekin (March 29, 1869-November 19, 1937) was an American marine engineer and inventor.  

Lovekin won the Elliott Cresson Medal in 1904, John Scott Medal in 1907 for his inventions.   Lovekin was born in England and came to the United States as a child, and started working in the shipbuilding field in the 1880s.   He was named chief engineer at the New York Shipbuilding Corporation in 1900.  During World War I, he moved to the American International Shipbuilding Corporation as vice president and advisory engineer.(21 November 1937). L. D. LOVEKIN DEAD; SHIP DESIGNER, 68; Inventor of Apparatus Used Widely at Sea Is Stricken at Villanova, Pa., The New York Times He was also president of the Lovekin Pipe Expanding and Flanging Machine Company.Who's who in Philadelphia, p. 21 (1920) (lists birthdate of March 29, 1869)

Charles A. Stone of Stone & Webster once referred to Lovekin as "the greatest marine engineer in the world."

He died at his home in Villanova, Pennsylvania on November 19, 1937, after a four year illness, at age 68.

References

1869 births
1937 deaths
American marine engineers
People from Villanova, Pennsylvania